National League Park is the name of two former baseball grounds located in Cleveland, Ohio, USA. The first ground was home to the Cleveland Blues of the National League from 1879 to 1884.

The Kennard Street Baseball Grounds (Kennard Street Park) was bounded by Sibley Street (present Carnegie Avenue) on the north, Cedar Avenue on the south, Kennard Street (present East 46th Street) on the west, and the eastern edge ended at the boundary of the back yards of the houses facing Willson Avenue (present East 55th Street). A contemporary plat map indicates the diamond was closest to the Kennard-Cedar intersection.

The second National League Park was the home of the Cleveland Spiders of the American Association from 1887 to 1888 and of the National League from 1889 to 1890. This ground was located a few blocks northwest of the Kennard site. After the 1890 season the Spiders moved to League Park.

References 

Sports venues in Cleveland
Defunct baseball venues in the United States
Cleveland Blues (NL)
Cleveland Spiders
Baseball venues in Ohio
Defunct sports venues in Ohio